Alberta Zanardi (born January 6, 1940) is an Italian sprint canoer who competed in the early 1960s. She finished seventh in the K-1 500 m event at the 1960 Summer Olympics in Rome.

References
Sports-reference.com profile

1940 births
Canoeists at the 1960 Summer Olympics
Italian female canoeists
Living people
Olympic canoeists of Italy
Place of birth missing (living people)
20th-century Italian people